Butcher Brown is a jazz quintet founded in 2009 and based in Richmond, Virginia. Their members are Marcus Tenney (trumpet and saxophone), Morgan Burrs (guitar), Corey Fonville (percussion), Andrew Randazzo (bass), and DJ Harrison (keyboards).

DownBeat has characterized them as a "'70s jazz-funk fusion throwback". Others describe their music as a mix of jazz, hip-hop, soul, funk, and R&B. National Public Radio says that "they scoff at the limitations of adjacent genres with the expertise of master musicians who've played together so long that they flow from one vibe to the next without missing a beat."

Butcher Brown's cover of Little Richard's "Rip It Up" was selected as the theme song of Monday Night Football in September 2020.

Albums 
They have released nine albums.

See also 

 Official web site

Notes 

Jazz fusion ensembles
American jazz ensembles from Virginia
2009 establishments in the United States
Musical groups established in 2009
Musical quintets